The Men's 5000 metres T54 event at the 2012 Summer Paralympics took place at the London Olympic Stadium from 31 August to 2 September.

Records
Prior to the competition, the existing World and Paralympic records were as follows:

Results

Round 1
Competed 31 August 2012 from 19:15. Qual. rule: first 3 in each heat (Q) plus the best fourth place (q) qualified.

Heat 1

Heat 2

Heat 3

Final
Competed 2 September 2012 at 21:49.

 
Q = qualified by place. q = qualified by time.

References

Athletics at the 2012 Summer Paralympics
2012 in men's athletics